Akhoury Purnendu Bhusan Sinha (born 1928) is an Indian solid state chemist and a former head of the Physical Chemistry Division of the National Chemical Laboratory, Pune. He is known for his theories on semiconductors and his studies on synthesis of manganites. He is an elected fellow of the Indian National Science Academy and the Indian Academy of Sciences. The Council of Scientific and Industrial Research, the apex agency of the Government of India for scientific research, awarded Sinha the Shanti Swarup Bhatnagar Prize for Science and Technology, one of the highest Indian science awards, in 1972, for his contributions to chemical sciences.

Biography 
A. P. B. Sinha, born on 27 December 1928, joined the University of London from where he secured a PhD in 1954; his thesis was based on solid state chemistry. Later, he served the National Chemical Laboratory, Pune as a director's grade scientist and headed the Physical Chemistry division of the institution. Continuing his researches on solid state chemistry, Sinha studied low mobility semiconductors with respect to its electron transport and crystal distortions caused by electron lattice transitions, switching, magnetic ordering and memory effects. He is known to have synthesized new manganites and reportedly developed a number of solid state products such as thermistors, photocells, magnets and photovoltaic products. Based on his studies on electron lattice interaction, Sinha proposed support theories for the ferroelectricity theory and developed new theories on the thermoelectrical power and mobility in semiconductors. His researches are reported to have widened the understanding of conduction in semiconductors. The body of his literary work is composed of one book, Spectroscopy in inorganic chemistry, chapters to the book, A study of the growth and structure of layers of oxides, sulphides and related compounds, with special reference to the effect of temperature, edited by C. N. R. Rao, and several articles published in peer reviewed journals. His work has been cited by several authors.

Sinha has been associated with journals such as Bulletin Materials Science and Indian Journal of Pure Applied Physics as a member of their editorial boards. The Council of Scientific and Industrial Research awarded him the Shanti Swarup Bhatnagar Prize, one of the highest Indian science awards, in 1972. Sinha was elected by the Indian Academy of Sciences as their fellow in 1974 before he became an elected fellow of the Indian National Science Academy in 1978. He is also an elected fellow of the Maharashtra Academy of Sciences and a recipient of the Meritorious Invention Award of the National Research Development Corporation which he received in 1978. After his stint at NCL, Sinha migrated to the US and is associated with the Morris Innovative Research.

Citations

Selected bibliography

Books

Articles

See also 
 Manganite
 Ferroelectricity

Notes

References

External links 
 
 

1928 births
Living people
Indian scientific authors
Recipients of the Shanti Swarup Bhatnagar Award in Chemical Science
Alumni of the University of London
20th-century Indian chemists
Solid-state chemistry
Indian physical chemists
Fellows of the Indian Academy of Sciences
Fellows of the Indian National Science Academy